The Lakes of Kumaon hills are a group of lakes located in the Nainital district, Kumaon. Nainital district is also called the ‘Lake District’ of India. These are under restoration with funds provided by the National Lake Conservation Plan (NLCP) of the Government of India. The major lakes are the Nainital, Bhimtal, Sat Tal (Sattal) and the Naukuchiatal

Gallery

References 

Kumaon
Kumaon
Uttarakhand-related lists
Kumaon division